Michelle Boulos (born December 24, 1988) is an American former competitive figure skater who competed in ladies' singles. She won one international medal, silver at the 2007 Ondrej Nepela Memorial. Her coaches included Evy Scotvold, Mary Scotvold, Konstantin Kostin, Suna Murray, and Peter Johansson.

Results

References

External links
 2007 Nationals bio
 Photos of Michelle Boulos from US Figure Skating Championships, 14 January 2006

1988 births
American female single skaters
Living people
Figure skaters from Boston
21st-century American women